Austin Nathan Croshere (born May 1, 1975) is a retired American professional basketball player who played for the Indiana Pacers, Dallas Mavericks, Golden State Warriors, Milwaukee Bucks and San Antonio Spurs throughout his 12-year career in the National Basketball Association (NBA). Since 2010, he has served as an NBA color commentator and studio analyst for a variety of television and radio programs.

Education
Croshere went to Crossroads School in Santa Monica, California, and then played college basketball for Providence College in Providence, Rhode Island.

Professional career

Indiana Pacers
Croshere was the 12th pick of the 1997 NBA Draft, selected by the Indiana Pacers.

A , hard-nosed player who played the power forward and small forward positions, Croshere shot 33.9% from three-point range over the course of his ten-year career. In the 1999–2000 NBA season, he had peaked at just the right time as he helped the Pacers advance to the 2000 NBA Finals, marking the Pacers' first Finals appearance since the ABA-NBA merger.

He was rewarded for his performance in the regular season and particularly the playoffs with a hefty contract. Croshere played 49 games in 2002–03, averaging a career-low 12.9 minutes per game that season as he fell out of the rotation.

Croshere became an important backup during the Rick Carlisle years, and was a key contributor against the Detroit Pistons in the 2004 Eastern Conference Finals.

On September 26, 2008, Larry Bird announced that Croshere was invited to training camp with the Pacers for an opportunity at a second stint. He was waived on October 23, 2008.

Dallas Mavericks
On July 5, 2006, Croshere was traded to the Dallas Mavericks for Marquis Daniels.  This move left Jeff Foster as the last Pacer remaining from the 1999–2000 Eastern Conference championship team.

Croshere scored a career-high 34 points in a Mavericks 122–102 win against the Seattle SuperSonics on January 30, 2007.

Golden State Warriors
On August 3, 2007, Croshere signed with the Golden State Warriors. The 2007–08 season was the first in Croshere's career where he did not make the playoffs.

Milwaukee Bucks
Croshere spent the 2008–09 pre-season with his former team, the Indiana Pacers. However, he was waived by the Pacers. On October 27, he was signed off waivers by the Milwaukee Bucks. He was released on January 6, 2009, after averaging 3.3 points and 2.2 rebounds per game.

San Antonio Spurs
On January 16, 2009, Croshere signed a 10-day contract with the San Antonio Spurs. On January 28, his contract expired and he was released by the Spurs after appearing in three games.

Post-NBA career
In February 2010, Croshere joined Fox Sports Indiana as a pre- and post-game analyst for Pacers games. He has also served as a color commentator. As of 2023, he is a basketball commentator for KABC-TV's Sports Zone post-game shows and college basketball analyst for Westwood One Radio.

NBA career statistics

Regular season

|-
| align="left" | 
| align="left" | Indiana
| 26 || 0 || 9.3 || .372 || .308 || .571 || 1.7 || .3 || .3 || .2 || 2.9
|-
| align="left" | 
| align="left" | Indiana
| 27 || 0 || 9.2 || .427 || .276 || .870 || 1.7 || .4 || .3 || .3 || 3.4
|-
| align="left" | 
| align="left" | Indiana
| 81 || 14 || 23.3 || .441 || .362 || .848 || 6.4 || 1.1 || .5 || .7 || 10.3
|-
| align="left" | 
| align="left" | Indiana
| 81 || 23 || 23.1 || .394 || .338 || .866 || 4.8 || 1.1 || .4 || .6 || 10.1
|-
| align="left" | 
| align="left" | Indiana
| 76 || 1 || 16.9 || .413 || .338 || .851 || 3.9 || 1.0 || .3 || .4 || 6.8
|-
| align="left" | 
| align="left" | Indiana
| 49 || 0 || 12.9 || .411 || .391 || .815 || 3.2 || 1.1 || .1 || .3 || 5.1
|-
| align="left" | 
| align="left" | Indiana
| 77 || 0 || 13.6 || .388 || .389 || .894 || 3.2 || .7 || .3 || .2 || 5.0
|-
| align="left" | 
| align="left" | Indiana
| 73 || 22 || 25.0 || .378 || .259 || .883 || 5.1 || 1.3 || .7 || .2 || 8.9
|-
| align="left" | 
| align="left" | Indiana
| 50 || 26 || 23.0 || .463 || .386 || .882 || 5.3 || 1.2 || .4 || .1 || 8.2
|-
| align="left" | 
| align="left" | Dallas
| 61 || 2 || 11.9 || .351 || .286 || .865 || 3.0 || .7 || .2 || .1 || 3.7
|-
| align="left" | 
| align="left" | Golden State
| 44 || 0 || 10.4 || .445 || .361 || .906 || 2.4 || .7 || .2 || .1 || 3.9
|-
| align="left" | 
| align="left" | Milwaukee
| 11 || 0 || 7.0 || .400 || .455 || .636 || 2.2 || .5 || .1 || .1 || 3.3
|-
| align="left" | 
| align="left" | San Antonio
| 3 || 0 || 7.7 || .222 || .000 || .000 || 3.3 || 1.0 || .0 || .0 || 1.3
|- class="sortbottom"
| style="text-align:center;" colspan="2"| Career
| 659 || 88 || 17.4 || .407 || .340 || .861 || 4.0 || 1.0 || .4 || .3 || 6.8

Playoffs

|-
| align="left" | 1999
| align="left" | Indiana
| 1 || 0 || 1.0 || .000 || .000 || 1.000 || 1.0 || .0 || .0 || .0 || 2.0
|-
| align="left" | 2000
| align="left" | Indiana
| 23 || 2 || 21.3 || .418 || .405 || .839 || 4.7 || .8 || .4 || .7 || 9.4
|-
| align="left" | 2001
| align="left" | Indiana
| 4 || 0 || 32.3 || .400 || .200 || .867 || 5.0 || 1.5 || 1.0 || .5 || 10.8
|-
| align="left" | 2002
| align="left" | Indiana
| 4 || 0 || 14.8 || .400 || .333 || .750 || 3.5 || .5 || .3 || .3 || 6.0
|-
| align="left" | 2003
| align="left" | Indiana
| 4 || 0 || 11.5 || .263 || .000 || .857 || 4.3 || .8 || .0 || .3 || 4.0
|-
| align="left" | 2004
| align="left" | Indiana
| 13 || 2 || 16.5 || .345 || .333 || .810 || 3.1 || .9 || .3 || .2 || 4.8
|-
| align="left" | 2005
| align="left" | Indiana
| 10 || 0 || 8.8 || .400 || .500 || .833 || 1.7 || .0 || .4 || .1 || 2.5
|-
| align="left" | 2006
| align="left" | Indiana
| 6 || 2 || 29.2 || .316 || .391 || .889 || 3.7 || 1.2 || .8 || .0 || 8.2
|-
| align="left" | 2007
| align="left" | Dallas
| 3 || 0 || 11.3 || .333 || .750 || 1.000 || 2.0 || .0 || .0 || .0 || 5.0
|- class="sortbottom"
| style="text-align:center;" colspan="2"| Career
| 68 || 6 || 18.2 || .379 || .360 || .844 || 3.6 || .7 || .4 || .4 || 6.7

Notes

External links
NBA.com Profile – Austin Croshere
NBA biography of Croshere (2008, in brief)
NBA biography of Croshere (2007, more detailed)

1975 births
Living people
American men's basketball players
Basketball players from Santa Monica, California
College basketball announcers in the United States
Crossroads School alumni
Dallas Mavericks players
Golden State Warriors players
Indiana Pacers announcers
Indiana Pacers draft picks
Indiana Pacers players
Milwaukee Bucks players
Power forwards (basketball)
Providence Friars men's basketball players
San Antonio Spurs players
Small forwards
Universiade medalists in basketball
Universiade gold medalists for the United States
Medalists at the 1995 Summer Universiade
Basketball players from Los Angeles